Werner Julius March (17 January 1894 – 11 January 1976) was a German architect, son of Otto March (1845-1913), and brother of Walter March, both also well-known German architects.  Werner March designed Germany's 1936 Olympic stadium. Werner March was born in Charlottenburg and died in Berlin.

Life and work
For the 1936 Summer Olympics in Germany, March created his most famous work, Berlin Olympic Stadium, which was on the site of the Deutsches Stadion, a stadium designed by his father, Otto March for use in the 1916 Summer Olympics (which were later cancelled after the outbreak of World War I). It is unclear whether March was influenced to use a more conservative design to suit Nazi tastes (claimed by Albert Speer), or whether March devised a grand, sweeping architecture that anticipated the spirit of the Third Reich.

The stadium, which has a capacity of 74,228, is one of the Germany's major sports venues and was used both for the 1974 and 2006 FIFA World Cup. He also created plans for the Central Stadium (Leipzig, GDR).  He designed Carinhall, Hermann Göring's  hunting lodge-style country residence near Berlin. During 1956 to 1960 he designed the Cairo International Stadium in Egypt. Designed as a multi-purpose stadium for the Olympic sports, it is primarily used as a venue for football games.

Together with his brother Walter, Werner March won a gold medal in the Art competitions at the Summer Olympics in 1936.

See also
 Nazi architecture

References

External links
 

1894 births
1976 deaths
20th-century German architects
Olympic gold medalists in art competitions
Olympic silver medalists in art competitions
Medalists at the 1936 Summer Olympics
Olympic competitors in art competitions
Stadium architects
German Army officers of World War II
Academic staff of the Technical University of Berlin